Guatemala competed at the 2011 World Aquatics Championships in Shanghai, China between July 16 and 31, 2011.

Open water swimming

Men

Women

Swimming

Guatemala qualified 2 swimmers.

Men

Women

References

Nations at the 2011 World Aquatics Championships
2011 in Guatemalan sport
Guatemala at the World Aquatics Championships